Gaudichaudia is the scientific name of two genera of organisms and may refer to:

Gaudichaudia (crab), a genus of crabs in the family Xanthidae
Gaudichaudia (plant), a genus of plants in the family Malpighiaceae